Richard G. Callahan (born April 22, 1947) is an American attorney who served as the United States Attorney for the Eastern District of Missouri from 2010 to 2017.

In 2018, Callahan again became a judge in Cole County, Missouri.

See also
 2017 dismissal of U.S. attorneys

References

1947 births
Living people
United States Attorneys for the Eastern District of Missouri
Missouri Democrats
Missouri state court judges
Georgetown University alumni
Georgetown University Law Center alumni